Leipzig Messe is a railway station located in Leipzig, Germany, serving the Leipzig Trade Fair. The station is located on the Trebnitz–Leipzig railway. The train services are operated by Deutsche Bahn. Since December 2013 the station is served by the S-Bahn Mitteldeutschland.

Train services
The following services currently call at the station:

References

Messe
Leipzig Messe